The M47 Patton was an American main battle tank, a development of the M46 Patton mounting an updated turret, and was in turn further developed as the M48 Patton. It was the second American tank to be named after General George S. Patton, commander of the U.S. Third Army during World War II and one of the earliest American advocates of tanks in battle.

The M47 was the U.S. Army's and Marine Corps' primary tank, intended to replace the M26 Pershing and M46 Patton medium tanks. The M47 was widely used by U.S. Cold War allies, both SEATO and NATO countries, and was the only Patton series tank that never saw combat while in US service.

Although the later M48s and M60s were similar in appearance, those were completely new tank designs. Many different M47 Patton models remain in service internationally. The M47 was the last US tank to have a bow-mounted machine gun in the hull.

Design
Although a new power plant corrected the mobility and reliability problems of the M26 Pershing, the subsequently renamed M46 was considered a stopgap solution that would be replaced later by the T42 medium tank. However, after fighting erupted in Korea, the Army decided that it needed the new tank earlier than planned. It was deemed that there was not enough time to finish the development of the T42. The final decision was to produce another interim solution, with the turret of the T42 mounted on the existing M46 hull. Although this interim tank was itself technically immature, Army officials felt the improvements over the M46 in firepower and armor were worth the risk. The composite tank, developed by the Detroit Arsenal, was named the M47 Patton.

In December 1950 the Army awarded a $100 million contract to the American Locomotive Company for the production of 500 tanks. It entered production in 1951. Its main gun was the M36 90 mm gun with an M12 optical rangefinder fitted. The secondary armament consisted of two .30 cal Browning machine guns, one in the bow and one coaxial with the 90mm main gun in the turret, and a .50 caliber Browning M2 on a pintle mount on the turret roof. The M47 was the last American-designed tank to include a bow machine gun. The T42 turret had a larger turret ring than the M26/M46 turret, and featured a needle-nose design, which improved armor protection of the turret front, an elongated turret bustle and storage bin which protruded halfway across the engine deck, and sloped sides to further improve ballistic protection; this gave the turret a decidedly lozenge-shaped profile. It also featured the M12 stereoscopic rangefinder, which was designed to improve first-round hit probability but proved difficult to use; the rangefinder protruded from both sides of the upper turret front, which would be a feature of American tanks until the advent of the M1 Abrams in 1980.

Production at American Locomotive began in July 1951. Logistical and technical issues plagued production almost from the start.

Truman administration policy sought to strengthen American arms makers' resilience to aerial attack by encouraging more decentralized weapons production – away from Detroit. The U.S. curtailed civilian automotive production to boost military production with the onset of the Korean War. As a result, Detroit's newly unemployed automotive workers found little work, while tank manufacturers outside Michigan lacked skilled workers. Truman's policy also counted on civilian factories being able to quickly transition to war-time production. However many factories lacked needed tank production machinery, done away with during World War II demobilization.

A faulty Ordnance Corps-designed hydraulic turret-control mechanism, shared by the M41 Walker Bulldog, kept the tanks from Korea while engineers worked on a fix. Engineers improved production quality controls of the hydraulics by April 1952, and set about correcting M47s sidelined in storage. By then Army officials had scrapped plans to send the tanks to Korea, in favor of providing them to troops stationed in Europe and at home.

The first M47s were not fielded to the 1st and 2nd Armored Divisions until summer 1952. Standardized in May 1952, the M47 Patton's production ran until November 1953; Detroit built 5,481 tanks, and American Locomotive Company (Alco) produced 3,095, for a total production run of 8,576 M47 Pattons.

Deployment

After the U.S. Army in Germany was equipped with the M47, the first M47s delivered under the Mutual Security Agency program were delivered to Portugal in 1952. In October the agency announced that NATO member nations had agreed to adopt the British Centurion main battle tank and the M47 as standard. By October the at Camp Drum in July, the New Jersey Army National Guard was the first reserve force to train with the tank.

The Marine Corps also fielded M47s starting in late 1952; after the Korean War, all seven Marine tank battalions, three divisional, two reserve training, and two force level, each fielded M47s. But these were soon replaced with M48A1 Pattons and M103 heavy tanks, with the last M47s being retired in 1959.

American Locomotive production was halted in October when the company's ordnance and locomotive divisions went on strike. Production resumed in February when union leaders agreed to a pay raise. In December 1952 the Defense Department ordered cutbacks to M47 and M48 tank production. In November 1953 American Locomotive halted production of the M47 after operators found drive gear defects in Europe. Army officials quickly acknowledged the issue arose from their own expedient decision to use lower grades of steel to circumvent wartime shortages. Chrysler laid off about 1000 workers at Detroit Tank Arsenal when it wrapped up production in November. American Locomotive resumed production in November. The company closed its tank division in June 1954.

With the arrival of the improved M48 Patton in 1953, the M47 was declared "limited standard" in 1955, and examples in tank units were replaced with the M48 series before long. After being declared obsolete in 1957, M46s and M47s were retained in active duty infantry division battlegroup assault gun platoons (four tanks each, one platoon per battlegroup, for a total of 20 tanks per division) until replaced with the light truck-mounted SS-10 anti-tank guided missile in the early 1960s. M47s were used by the Reserves for a relatively short time, soon being replaced by early production M48 Patton series tanks; thus, most of the M47s were exported in the late 1950s.

The M47 was widely used by many countries, especially NATO and SEATO allies, including Austria (147), Belgium (784), Ethiopia (30), France (856), Greece (396), Portugal (161), from USA and West Germany), Iran (around 400), Italy (2,480), Japan (1 for evaluation only), Jordan (49), Pakistan (100), Portugal (161), Saudi Arabia (23 from the US, 108 on the international market), Somalia (25 from Saudi Arabia), South Korea (531), Sudan (17 from Saudi Arabia), Spain (389), Switzerland (2 for evaluation), Turkey (1,347 from the US and West Germany), West Germany (1,120), and Yugoslavia (319). Like the US Army of the time, the West German Bundeswehr also used the M47 in a tank destroyer role until replacing them with the Kanonenjagdpanzer in 1966.

U.S. Army M47s remaining in storage were expended as targets.

Combat service

Near the end of the Korean war, some M47s were deployed for field testing. Some of these had 18-inch searchlights.
France deployed a squadron of its M47s against Egypt during the Suez Crisis in 1956.
Pakistan fielded M47s against India in both the Indo-Pakistani War of 1965 and Indo-Pakistani War of 1971.
Jordan used M47s against Israel in the Six-Day War in 1967.
The M47 was used by the Turkish Army in the Turkish invasion of Cyprus between July and August 1974, with an estimated 200 Patton tanks involved in the combat action. At least one operational M47, Serial Number 092273, was captured by the Cyprus National Guard and remained in their service until 1993. This example is currently stored at the camp of the 25 ΕΜΑ in Paphos for use as a training and a war-memorial exhibit.
During Ogaden War the Somalis used T-54 and T-55 tanks to defeat Ethiopian M41 and M47 tanks.
Iran sent their M47s to fight against Iraq in the Iran–Iraq War between 1980 and 1988. Iranian M47s were roughly equivalent to the T-54s but not as good as the T-55s, performed very poorly against much-superior Iraqi tanks such as the T-62s and T-72s. Large numbers of M47 Patton tanks fell into Iraqi capture by the end of the war.
In the Somaliland War of Independence, some of the country's large M47 collection (obtained prior to the war) may have seen some service in the initial stages of the internal conflict but these aging vehicles soon ceased operations (and left abandoned and/or destroyed) due to a lack of spare parts and proper maintenance by the Somali Army.
In the 1980s and up to the early 1990s, the Turkish Army used M47 tanks against PKK guerrillas within Turkey and neighbouring Iraq. Turkish M48A5 variants replaced all remaining M47s by the late 1990s.
Croatia used M47s against their Serbian enemies in the Croatian War of Independence but their performance was regarded as inferior to that of the Soviet-designed T-55. The M47s were retired from service immediately after the war and are now used as gunnery/missile live-firing targets during military exercises.

Variants

 M46E1 – pilot model, M46 hull with T42 turret, fitted with the M36 90 mm Gun, and was longer to incorporate a radio, ventilator, and featured a stereoscopic rangefinder; only one built
 M47 – main production version, M46 hull modified with redesigned glacis, reduction from five to three track return rollers per side, longer mufflers on rear fenders; 8,576 built
 M47E1 (U.S.) – American designation for M47 tanks modified to use the fire control system of the British Centurion main battle tank, complete with its gun stabilizer system. It was rated highly by crews in comparative evaluation with other American vehicles of the period, but was not adopted due to the M47 reaching the end of its production life; up to 20 built
M47M – The product of an improvement program started in the late 1960s, the M47M featured the engine and fire control elements from the M60A1. The assistant driver's position was eliminated in favor of additional 90 mm ammunition. Not used by the US; over 800 vehicles were produced for Iran and Pakistan
M47E – Spanish M47M austere version (kept original FCS).
M47E1 (Spain) – Second Spanish upgrade batch with rearranged main gun ammunition storage and crew heater. Both new and upgraded M47Es. 330 converted.
M47E2 – 45 built. M47E1 with Rh-105 105 mm gun and improved FCS (still electromechanical). Passive night vision for driver and commander. All M47 series MBT in Spanish service retired 1993.
M47ER3 – Spanish armored recovery vehicle. 22 built.
Sabalan – Iranian upgraded version of the US M47M, It has side skirts and a newly built turret fitted with a 105 mm gun, laser range finder, new fire control system and communication equipment. Never used in active service.
Tiam – Iranian variant of the Sabalan fitted with Type 59 tank turret, new fire control system, new communication equipment, composite and reactive armor.

Additional equipment

M6 – Earth Moving Tank Mounting Bulldozer. Bulldozer kit for the M47 series.
Unknown name - Switching 90mm M36 to 90mm M41 which used by M48 Patton III.
M47 with 105 mm (France) – French upgrade with 105 mm CN 105 F1 gun, extra ammunition storage by removing assistant driver position, and infrared spotlight.
M47 with 105 mm (Italy) – Italian upgrade with OTO Melara 105 mm L/52 gun, new fire control systems, and new AVDS-1790-2A diesel engine.

Operators

Current operators
  400 M47 delivered in the 1960s. Upgraded locally to M47M in the 1970s. 170 M47M operational
  – 22 M47ER3 ARV based on M47 hulls modernized in 1992–94. Currently used as recovery vehicles in artillery and infantry units.

Former operators

  – 153 M47s in active service from 1957 till 1982. Since 1972, turrets of retired M47 tanks were fixed in Austrian bunker systems.
  – One of the surviving examples is visible in the Brussels Military Museum
 
  – Over 20 during the Croatian War of Independence, 16 units remained in service by 1996 but were soon retired.
  – One captured vehicle.
  – 30 acquired from Yugoslavia in 1977.
  – 856 (1954–1970) One of the tanks was converted with the 105mm gun developed for the AMX-30, including modifications to the gun breech assembly and ammunition racks.
  – 396 pieces in total, of which 391 were scrapped between 1992 and 1995.
  – Captured from Iran. All destroyed or scrapped.
  – Up to 2,000 acquired. In the late 1960s one was converted to diesel engine power and fitted with a 105 mm gun for trials.
  – Acquired 60 captured Iranian M47s through Iraq.
 
  - 2 pieces acquired for testing purpose before M48 purchase in 1962. Both exist today in a non-usable condition.
  – Retired in 2002–2003

  - 161 M-47 Tanks - an entire Armoured Brigade plus a Battalion worth - received from 1952 onwards, under Mutual Security Agency. The started being decommissioned in 1978 and some served until the mid 80's.
 
  – All lost during the Somaliland War of Independence and the Somali Civil War (one tank captured by US Army)
  – Acquired a total of 531 vehicles—463 for the army between 1956 and 1959, and 68 for the marine corps between 1963 and 1964—mainly from the USFK. Around three-quarters of the M47s replaced their 90 mm M36 guns with the 90 mm M41 guns that became available when their M48s upgraded their guns from 90 mm M41 to 105 mm M68. The last vehicle was out of service in 2007.
  – 1,102 tanks were fielded.
  – 1,347 tanks were fielded. Today all M47s were recycled and the steel used for civil purposes, except one tank that was delivered to the Istanbul Military Museum and one tank as war memorial in location  (Cyprus).
 
  – Total of 319 delivered during the 1950s when U.S. President Dwight D. Eisenhower feared that the USSR could attack Yugoslavia via the Hungarian-Yugoslav border.

Evaluation only operators
  – One M47 was provided for evaluation, and used as reference for the STA(Type 61 tank prototype) development. After being used for comparison with prototype vehicles of STA and technical analysis, it was disposed of. This tank was not scrapped, and is kept in a private collection (not open to the public as of 2021).

Civilian operators
  – 1 former Austrian Army M47 owned by Arnold Schwarzenegger. He previously operated the vehicle (331) during his mandatory service in 1965, which he later obtained in 1992 and now uses to support his charity.

See also

Centurion - British Tank
T-54 – Soviet tank
M26 Pershing
M46 Patton
M48 Patton
Type 61
M60 Patton
List of armoured fighting vehicles
M103 (heavy tank)
G-numbers SNL G262

Notes

References

External links

AFV Database: M47 Patton
GlobalSecurity.org: M47 Patton
Patton-Mania
M47 Photos and Walk Arounds on Prime Portal
"Army's Latest Medium Tank Features Lethal Firepower." Popular Mechanics, June 1952, p. 88. early public relation article for M-47.

Cold War tanks of the United States
Medium tanks of the United States
Medium tanks of the Cold War
Military vehicles introduced in the 1950s